The canton of Sainte-Maure-de-Touraine is an administrative division of the Indre-et-Loire department, central France. Its borders were modified at the French canton reorganisation which came into effect in March 2015. Its seat is in Sainte-Maure-de-Touraine.

Composition

Prior to 2015 
The canton of Sainte-Maure-de-Touraine contained the 12 communes of:

Since 2015 
It consists of the following communes:
 
Anché
Antogny-le-Tillac
Assay
Avon-les-Roches
Braslou
Braye-sous-Faye
Brizay
Champigny-sur-Veude
Chaveignes
Chezelles
Courcoué
Cravant-les-Côteaux
Crissay-sur-Manse
Crouzilles
Faye-la-Vineuse
L'Île-Bouchard
Jaulnay
Lémeré
Ligré
Luzé
Maillé
Marcilly-sur-Vienne
Marigny-Marmande
Neuil
Nouâtre
Noyant-de-Touraine
Panzoult
Parçay-sur-Vienne
Ports-sur-Vienne
Pouzay
Pussigny
Razines
Richelieu
Rilly-sur-Vienne
Sainte-Catherine-de-Fierbois
Sainte-Maure-de-Touraine
Saint-Épain
Sazilly
Tavant
Theneuil
La Tour-Saint-Gelin
Trogues
Verneuil-le-Château

References

Cantons of Indre-et-Loire